Esporte Clube Novo Hamburgo, commonly referred to as Novo Hamburgo, is a Brazilian football club based in Novo Hamburgo, Rio Grande do Sul. It currently plays in Campeonato Gaúcho Série A, the first level of the Rio Grande do Sul state football league.

Home stadium is the Estádio do Vale (Stadium of the Valley). It has a maximum capacity of 5,196.

History
On 1 May 1911, employees of Adams Footwear Factory founded an association. In that day, during the celebrations of the Worker's Day, as it used to happen every year, took place a social gathering event between the employers and employees of the factory. After the barbecue ended, they always played football. Manoel Lopes Mattos, João Scherer, Aloys Auschild, Manoel Outeiro, João Tamujo and Adão Steigleder decided to found a football club. The suggested name was Adams Futebol Clube, but the name they chose was Sport Club Novo Hamburgo, later renamed to Esporte Clube Novo Hamburgo.

As Brazil entered World War II in 1944 war joining the allies side, Novo Hamburgo had to change its name, as it was of German origin – Novo Hamburgo means New Hamburg. The city was renamed to Marechal Floriano Peixoto and the club turned into Esporte Clube Floriano. In 1968, the club reverted to its previous name.

Campeonato Gaúcho 2017 
In 2017, Novo Hamburgo conquered its greatest title: the 2017 Campeonato Gaúcho. The club started the season with an extremely well campaign, the team organized by head coach Beto Campos was able to win seven games of the first round and have only two losses, finishing in first in the table, ahead of traditional powerhouses like Grêmio and Internacional. At the playoffs, Novo hamburgo defeated São José at the quarterfinals with victories in both legs. The team met Grêmio in the semi-finals, tying both games and winning at the penalties. The finals were against Internacional, in the first leg at the Beira Rio, the match ended with a 2 × 2 tie, the championship was decided in a neutral field at the Estádio Centenário in Caxias do Sul; the match again ended in a tie and Novo Hamburgo won in the penalties with a 3 × 1 score. It was the first time a team outside the Grenal duo to win the title since Caxias in 2000, and it was a remarkable underdog victory.

Rivals
Novo Hamburgo's first rival was Sociedade Esportiva Esperança, from the same city. At that time, Novo Hamburgo was named Floriano. The derby was known as Flor-Esp.

The second and current rival of Novo Hamburgo is Aimoré from São Leopoldo, as both cities are located in the Sinos River Valley, the derby is known as the Clássico do Vale (Derby of the Valley). This rivalry was stronger during the 1960s and the 1970s, but continues up until today.

Current squad

Honours
 Campeonato Gaúcho: 2017
 Campeonato Gaúcho Série B: 1996, 2000
 Copa FGF: 2005, 2013
 Copa Metropolitana: 2013, 2014
 Copa Emídio Perondi: 2005
 Copa ACEG: 1982, 1984

Trivia
The famous player Garrincha, who won the 1958 and the 1962 World Cups, played once for Novo Hamburgo. On 2 July 1969, he wore the number 7 of the club. The friendly match, played at Beira-Rio stadium ended 3–1 in favour of Internacional. He played the whole first half, and the first 15 minutes of the second one.

Ultra groups
Two ultra groups supports the club: Fogo Anil and Torcida Independente Mancha Anil. Fogo Anil was founded in 1996, and Torcida Independente Mancha Anil was founded on 13 May 2005.

Anthem
The club's anthem lyrics were composed by Juracy Araújo, the music by Pedro Araújo and the piano transcription by Rejane Frota Dillenburg.

Mascot
The club's mascot is an anthropomorphic shoe, as Novo Hamburgo is known for its shoe industry.

References

External links
Official Website

 
Association football clubs established in 1911
Football clubs in Rio Grande do Sul
Esporte Clube Novo Hamburgo